Bovio is an Italian surname. Notable people with the surname include:

Giovanni Bovio (1837-1903), Italian philosopher and politician 
Libero Bovio (1883-1942), Neapolitan lyricist and dialect poet
Marcela Bovio (born 1979), Mexican singer, violinist, songwriter, and vocal teacher
Ricardo Bóvio (born 1982), Brazilian footballer

See also
Bovio (Roman Britain), a former Roman settlement at Tilston, England

Italian-language surnames